Edward Joseph O'Donnell (July 4, 1931 – February 1, 2009) was an American prelate of the Roman Catholic Church who served as the fifth bishop of the Diocese of Lafayette in Louisiana from 1994 to 2002.  He previously served as an auxiliary bishop of the Archdiocese of Saint Louis in Missouri from 1983 to 1994,

O'Donnell built a reputation as a strong supporter of the Civil Rights Movement in the United States during the 1960's.

Biography

Early life 
Edward O'Donnell was born on July 4, 1931, Saint Louis, Missouri.  He attended Kenrick Seminary in Shrewsbury, Missouri.  

O'Donnell was ordained to the priesthood for the Archdiocese of Saint Louis on April 6, 1956, by Cardinal Joseph Ritter.  In 1965, O'Donnell led a contingent from St. Louis to Alabama to participate in the Selma to Montgomery civil rights march.

O'Donnell ran the Radio and Television Apostolate for the archdiocese.  He moderated  a television programs called “Quiz A Catholic” and appeared on radio in discussions with clergy from other faiths.

Auxiliary Bishop of Saint Louis 
On December 6, 1982, Pope John Paul II appointed O'Donnell as an auxiliary bishop of the Archdiocese of Saint Louis; he was consecrated by Archbishop John Lawrence May on February 10, 1983.   He also served as vicar general of the archdiocese and edited its newspaper.

In 1993, O'Donnell was appointed as apostolic administrator of the archdiocese while Archbishop May was fighting brain cancer.  He served in this role for 15 months.  He founded the Pro-Life Committee for the archdiocese as part of his opposition to abortion rights for women.  It was one of the first Catholic groups in the nation to provide support to women who chose not to have abortions.

Bishop of Lafayette 
On November 8, 1994, John Paul II appointed O'Donnell as bishop of the Diocese of Lafayette.  He was installed on December 16, 1994.  One of O'Donnell's initiatives was to increase the number of African-Americans in diocesan affairs.  He also instituted one of the first zero tolerance policies towards child sexual abuse by clergy in the nation.

On November 8, 2002, John Paul II accepted O'Donnell's resignation as bishop of the Diocese of Lafayette.  Edward O'Donnell died from Parkinson's disease on February 1, 2009, at St. Agnes Home in Kirkwood, Missouri, at age 77.

Notes

1931 births
2009 deaths
Clergy from St. Louis
People from Lafayette, Louisiana
Roman Catholic Archdiocese of St. Louis
20th-century Roman Catholic bishops in the United States
21st-century Roman Catholic bishops in the United States
Religious leaders from Missouri
Catholics from Louisiana